Path of Development and Reconstruction (Egypt) to enhance the economy of Egypt, is a national project in the Western Desert of Egypt that is proposed by Farouk El-Baz initially in the 80th and reintroduced to the Egyptian government after the 25 January, 2011 revolution.

Description 

The passage development is a corridor reconstruction route that starts on the Mediterranean coast at the site between Alexandria and El Alamein. It includes the establishment of a new global port comparable to other international ports, and provides for the use of modern information technology in dealing easily and quickly with exports and imports of goods and commerce.

Development consists of the main road of the eight lanes at least, two of the trucks and two cars back and forth, as necessary, paved to international standards that allow safe speed without stopping, except in cases of emergency stations and rest, fuel centers and collection of fees for traffic.

Water pipe

Necessary to provide safe drinking water along the corridor of the proposed plateau of Western Sahara.

Power line

Necessary for the proposal to establish a line of electricity for lighting and cooling along the main road, especially because the route passes in a desert area where the requirements do not exist Development infrastructure, through the early stages of the project.

References

External links
 
 
 
 English Path of Development and Reconstruction in Egypt

Proposed buildings and structures in Egypt